Gmina Kolno may refer to either of the following rural administrative districts in Poland:
Gmina Kolno, Podlaskie Voivodeship
Gmina Kolno, Warmian-Masurian Voivodeship